Charles M. Lieber (born 1959) is an American chemist, a pioneer in nanoscience and nanotechnology, and a convicted felon. In 2011, Lieber was named the leading chemist in the world for the decade 2000–2010 by Thomson Reuters, based on the impact of his scientific publications. He is known for his contributions to the synthesis, assembly and characterization of nanoscale materials and nanodevices, the application of nanoelectronic devices in biology, and as a mentor to numerous leaders in nanoscience.

Lieber, a professor at Harvard University, has published over 400 papers in peer-reviewed journals and has edited and contributed to many books on nanoscience. Until 2020 he was the chair of the Department of Chemistry and Chemical Biology, and held a joint appointment in that department and the School of Engineering and Applied Sciences as the Joshua and Beth Friedman University Professor. He is the principal inventor on over fifty issued US patents and applications, and joined nanotechnology company Nanosys as a scientific co-founder in 2001 and Vista Therapeutics in 2007. In 2012, Lieber was awarded the Wolf Prize in Chemistry in a special ceremony held at the Israeli Knesset.

In December 2021, Lieber was convicted of six felonies, including two counts of making false statements to the FBI and investigators from the Department of Defense and National Institutes of Health regarding his participation in the Chinese government's Thousand Talents Program, as well as four counts of filing false tax returns. The US government began its investigation of Lieber as part of the China Initiative, a program established by the Department of Justice in 2018 to investigate academic espionage at American universities.

Lieber has been on paid leave from Harvard since his arrest in 2020 as a result of his criminal charges and a lymphoma diagnosis.

Early life, education, and career 
Lieber was born in Philadelphia, Pennsylvania in 1959 and "spent much of his childhood building – and breaking – stereos, cars and model airplanes."

Lieber obtained a B.A. in Chemistry from Franklin & Marshall College, graduating with honors in 1981. He went on to earn his doctorate at Stanford University in Chemistry, carrying out research on surface chemistry in the lab of Nathan Lewis, followed by a two-year postdoc at Caltech in the lab of Harry Gray on long-distance electron transfer in metalloproteins. Studying the effects of dimensionality and anisotropy on the properties of quasi-2D planar structures and quasi-1D structures in his early career at Columbia and Harvard led him to become interested in the question of how one could make a one-dimensional wire, and to the epiphany that if a technology were to emerge from nascent work on nanoscale materials "it would require interconnections – exceedingly small, wire-like structures to move information around, move electrons around, and connect devices together". Lieber was an early proponent of using the fundamental physical advantages of the very small to meld the worlds of optics and electronics and create interfaces between nanoscale materials and biological structures, and "to develop entirely new technologies, technologies we cannot even predict today."

Lieber joined the Columbia University Department of Chemistry in 1987, where he was Assistant Professor (1987–1990) and Associate Professor (1990–1991) before moving to Harvard as Full Professor in 1992. He holds a joint appointment at Harvard University in the Department of Chemistry and Chemical Biology and the Harvard Paulson School of Engineering and Applied Sciences, as the Joshua and Beth Friedman University Professor. He became Chair of Harvard's Department of Chemistry and Chemical Biology in 2015. Lieber was placed on "indefinite" paid administrative leave in January 2020 shortly after his arrest for making false statement to federal agents.

Lieber's contributions to the rational growth, characterization, and applications of a range of functional nanoscale materials and heterostructures have provided concepts central to the bottom-up paradigm of nanoscience. These include rational synthesis of functional nanowire building blocks, characterization of these materials, and demonstration of their application in areas ranging from electronics, computing, photonics, and energy science to biology and medicine.

Contributions 
Lieber's contributions to the rational growth, characterization, and applications of a range of functional nanoscale materials and heterostructures have provided concepts central to the bottom-up paradigm of nanoscience. These include rational synthesis of functional nanowire building blocks, characterization of these materials, and demonstration of their application in areas ranging from electronics, computing, photonics, and energy science to biology and medicine.

Nanomaterials synthesis. In his early work Lieber articulated the motivation for pursuing designed growth of nanometer-diameter wires in which composition, size, structure and morphology could be controlled over a wide range, and outlined a general method for the first controlled synthesis of free-standing single-crystal semiconductor nanowires, providing the groundwork for predictable growth of nanowires of virtually any elements and compounds in the periodic table. He proposed and demonstrated a general concept for the growth of nanoscale axial heterostructures and the growth of nanowire superlattices with new photonic and electronic properties, the basis of intensive efforts today in nanowire photonics and electronics.

Nanostructure characterization. Lieber developed applications of scanning probe microscopies that could provide direct experimental measurement of the electrical and mechanical properties of individual carbon nanotubes and nanowires. This work showed that semiconductor nanowires with controlled electrical properties can be synthesized, providing electronically tunable functional nanoscale building blocks for device assembly. Additionally, Lieber invented chemical force microscopy to characterize the chemical properties of materials surfaces with nanometer resolution.

Nanoelectronics and nanophotonics. Lieber has used quantum-confined core/shell nanowire heterostructures to demonstrate ballistic transport, the superconducting proximity effect, and quantum transport. Other examples of functional nanoscale electronic and optoelectronic devices include nanoscale electrically driven lasers using single nanowires as active nanoscale cavities, carbon nanotube nanotweezers, nanotube-based ultrahigh-density electromechanical memory, an all-inorganic fully integrated nanoscale photovoltaic cell and functional logic devices and simple computational circuits using assembled semiconductor nanowires. These concepts led to the integration of nanowires on the Intel roadmap, and their current top-down implementation of these structures.

Nanostructure assembly and computing. Lieber has originated a number of approaches for parallel and scalable of assembly of nanowire and nanotube building blocks. The development of fluidic-directed assembly and subsequent large-scale assembly of electrically addressable parallel and crossed nanowire arrays was cited as one of the Breakthroughs of 2001 by Science. He also developed a lithography-free approach to bridging the macro-to-nano scale gap using modulation-doped semiconductor nanowires. Lieber recently introduced the assembly concept "nanocombing", to create a programmable nanowire logic tile and the first stand-alone nanocomputer.

Nanoelectronics for biology and medicine. Lieber demonstrated the first direct electrical detection of proteins, selective electrical sensing of individual viruses and multiplexed detection of cancer marker proteins and tumor enzyme activity. More recently, Lieber demonstrated a general approach to overcome the Debye screening that makes these measurements challenging in physiological conditions, overcoming the limitations of sensing with silicon nanowire field-effect devices and opening the way to their use in diagnostic healthcare applications. Lieber has also developed nanoelectronic devices for cell/tissue electrophysiology, showing that electrical activity and action potential propagation can be recorded from cultured cardiac cells with high resolution. Most recently, Lieber realized 3D nanoscale transistors in which the active transistor is separated from the connections to the outside world. His nanotechnology-enabled 3D cellular probes have shown point-like resolution in detection of single-molecules, intracellular function and even photons.

Nanoelectronics and brain science. The development of nanoelectronics-enabled cellular tools underpins Lieber's views on transforming electrical recording and modulation of neuronal activity in brain science. Examples of this work include the integration of arrays of nanowire transistors with neurons at the scale that the brain is wired biologically, mapping functional activity in acute brain slices with high spatiotemporal resolution and a 3D structure capable of interfacing with complex neural networks. He developed macroporous 3D sensor arrays and synthetic tissue scaffold to mimic the structure of natural tissue, and for the first time generated synthetic tissues that can be innervated in 3D, showing that it is possible to produce interpenetrating 3D electronic-neural networks following cell culture. Lieber's current work focuses on integrating electronics in a minimally/non-invasive manner within the central nervous system. Most recently, he has demonstrated that this macroporous electronics can be injected by syringe to position devices in a chosen region of the brain. Chronic histology and multiplexed recording studies demonstrate minimal immune response and noninvasive integration of the injectable electronics with neuronal circuitry. Reduced scarring may explain the mesh electronics' demonstrated recording stability on time scales of up to a year. This concept of electronics integration with the brain as a nanotechnological tool potentially capable of treating neurological and neurodegenerative diseases, stroke and traumatic injury has drawn attention from a number of media sources. Scientific American named injectable electronics one of 2015's top ten world changing ideas. Chemical & Engineering News called it "the most notable chemistry research advance of 2015".

Criminal conviction 
On January 28, 2020, Lieber was charged with making materially false, fictitious and fraudulent statements about his links to a Chinese university. The Department of Justice (DOJ) charging document alleges two counts. First, that during an interview by the Department of Defense (DoD) on April 24, 2018,  Lieber was asked whether he was involved in the Thousand Talents Program. Lieber stated that "he was never asked to participate in the Thousand Talents Program," adding that "he 'wasn't sure' how China categorized him." The DOJ asserted that Lieber's statement was false because an intercepted email dated June 27, 2012, from Wuhan University of Technology (WUT) included a contract for  Lieber to sign. Second, that in November 2018, the National Institutes of Health (NIH) asked Harvard University about Lieber's foreign affiliations. In January 2019, Harvard interviewed Lieber and then reported to the NIH that Lieber, "had no formal association with WUT," after 2012. The Federal Bureau of Investigation (FBI) believed Lieber's statements regarding the matter to be false.

During his arraignment, authorities executed search warrants at his home and office in Lexington, Massachusetts. At that time he was placed on paid administrative leave by Harvard.

On June 9, 2020, the DOJ  alleged that, beginning in 2011 and unbeknownst to Harvard, Lieber became a "Strategic Scientist" at Wuhan University of Technology (WUT) in China. And that he was a contractual participant in China's Thousand Talents Plan from at least 2012 through 2015. A month later Lieber was charged with four counts of violating tax laws by failing to report income he allegedly received from China.

Critics expressed worry that Lieber's arrest could amount to McCarthyism, as a part of rising tension with China amid the China–United States trade war, beginning during the Trump administration. Dr. Ross McKinney Jr., chief scientific officer of the Association of American Medical Colleges, claimed there is increasing anxiety among his colleagues that scientists will be scrutinized over legitimate sources of international funding, "...slowly but surely, we're going to have something of a McCarthyish purity testing". In March 2021, several dozen scientists, including seven Nobel Prize winners, published an open letter in support of Lieber, arguing that his prosecution by the government was "unjust" and "misguided" and "discouraging US scientists from collaborating with peers in other countries".

In the spring of 2021, Lieber requested that his trial be expedited because he was suffering from lymphoma.

Lieber's trial opened on December 14, 2021, in Boston with jury selection. He pleaded not guilty to all six felony charges. On December 21, 2021, Lieber was found guilty on two counts of making false statements to the U.S. government, two counts of filing a  false income tax return, and two counts of failing to report foreign bank accounts. In a taped interview, Lieber admitted traveling from Wuhan to Boston with bags of cash containing between $50,000 and $100,000, which he said he never disclosed to the IRS. He faces up to 26 years in prison and $1.2 million in fines. He will be sentenced in March 2023.

Awards
 Feynman Prize in Nanotechnology (2001)
 NBIC Research Excellence Award in Nanotechnology, University of Pennsylvania (2007)
 Wolf Prize in Chemistry (2012)
 IEEE Nanotechnology Pioneer Award (2013)
 Remsen Award (2016) 
 Welch Award in Chemistry (2019)

Other honors and positions
Lieber is a member of the National Academy of Sciences, the American Academy of Arts and Sciences, the National Academy of Engineering, the National Academy of Medicine, the National Academy of Inventors, and an elected Foreign Member of the Chinese Academy of Sciences (2015). He is an elected Fellow of the Materials Research Society, American Chemical Society (Inaugural Class), Institute of Physics, International Union of Pure and Applied Chemistry (IUPAC), American Association for the Advancement of Science, and World Technology Network, and Honorary Fellow of the Chinese Chemical Society. In addition he belongs to the American Physical Society, Institute of Electrical and Electronics Engineers (IEEE), International Society for Optical Engineering (SPIE), Optica, Biophysical Society and the Society for Neuroscience. Lieber is Co-editor of the journal Nano Letters, and serves on the editorial and advisory boards of a number of science and technology journals. He is also a sitting member of the International Advisory Board of the Department of Materials Science and Engineering at Tel Aviv University.

Pumpkin growing
Since 2007 Lieber has grown giant pumpkins in his front and back yards in Lexington, Massachusetts. In 2010 he won the annual weigh-off at Frerich's Farm in Rhode Island with a 1,610-lb pumpkin, and returned in 2012 with a 1,770-lb pumpkin that won 2nd place in that year's weigh-off but set a Massachusetts record. His 1,870-lb pumpkin in 2014 was named the largest pumpkin in Massachusetts and ranked 17th largest in the world that year. In 2020, the year of his arrest, he grew a 2,276-lb pumpkin that currently holds the record for the largest ever grown in Massachusetts.

See also
 Molecular electronics
 Nanoparticle
 Self-assembly

References

External links
 Lieber Research Group Website
 Harvard Chemistry and Chemical Biology page
 Harvard Paulson SEAS page

1959 births
Living people
American nanotechnologists
Carbon scientists
21st-century American chemists
American technology writers
21st-century American inventors
Harvard University faculty
Columbia University faculty
Members of the United States National Academy of Sciences
Fellows of the American Chemical Society
Foreign members of the Chinese Academy of Sciences
Scientists from Philadelphia
Franklin & Marshall College alumni
Stanford University alumni
Jewish American scientists
21st-century American Jews
Members of the National Academy of Medicine
Fellows of the American Physical Society